The Oman Basketball Association is the governing body of basketball in Oman.

The association founded in 1987, represents basketball with public authorities as well as with national and international sports organizations and as such with Oman in international competitions. It also defends the moral and material interests of Basketball in Oman. It is affiliated with FIBA and FIBA Asia.

The association also organizes the Oman national basketball team and the Oman women's national basketball team.

Leagues
Oman Basketball League

External links 
Official website of Oman Basketball Association

Basketball
1987 establishments in Oman
Basketball governing bodies in Asia
Sports organizations established in 1987